Oscivirus is a genus of viruses in the order Picornavirales, in the family Picornaviridae. Birds serve as natural hosts. There is only one species in this genus: Oscivirus A.

Structure
Viruses in Oscivirus are non-enveloped, with icosahedral and spherical geometries, and T=pseudo3 symmetry. The diameter is around 30 nm. Genomes are linear and non-segmented, around 7.6kb in length.

Life cycle
Viral replication is cytoplasmic. Entry into the host cell is achieved by attachment of the virus to host receptors, which mediates endocytosis. Replication follows the positive stranded RNA virus replication model. Positive stranded RNA virus transcription is the method of transcription. The virus exits the host cell by lysis, and viroporins. Birds serve as the natural host.

References

External links
 Viralzone: Oscivirus
 ICTV

Picornaviridae
Virus genera